Vincent James Oliver (December 28, 1915 – August 28, 1985) was an American professional basketball and football player. He played in the National Basketball League for the Hammond Ciesar All-Americans in five games during the 1938–39 season. Oliver scored two total points. During the 1945 NFL season, Oliver was a back-up quarterback for the Chicago Cardinals. In three games, including one start, he threw four completions in ten attempts.

References

External links

1915 births
1985 deaths
American football quarterbacks
American men's basketball players
Basketball players from Indiana
Chicago Cardinals players
Guards (basketball)
Hammond Ciesar All-Americans players
High school basketball coaches in Illinois
High school basketball coaches in Indiana
High school football coaches in Illinois
Indiana Hoosiers football players
Indiana Hoosiers men's basketball players
People from Whiting, Indiana
Whiting High School alumni